Charles O'Connell (born April 21, 1975) is an American actor and reality television personality. He is known for his appearance on The Bachelor, as well as appearing in several projects involving his older brother Jerry O'Connell, including a starring role as Colin Mallory in Season 4 of the science fiction television series Sliders.

Life and career
O'Connell was born in New York City, New York,  the son of Linda (née Witkowski), an art teacher, and Michael O'Connell, an advertising agency art director. His maternal grandfather, Charles S. Witkowski, was the mayor of Jersey City, New Jersey O'Connell is of half Irish, one quarter Italian, and one quarter Polish ancestry. O'Connell appeared in small roles in such films as Dude, Where's My Car? and The New Guy, the latter of which also paired him with his brother Jerry. He obtained greater notoriety when he appeared with his brother in Sliders and then on the seventh season of the reality television series The Bachelor between March 2005 and May 2005. In two episodes of Crossing Jordan, entitled "Sunset Division" (season 2) and "Skin and Bone" (season 4), he played the onscreen brother of his brother's character, Detective Woody Hoyt.

Filmography

Television
V.I.P. (1998) - Jimmie ("Val Got Game")
Zoe, Duncan, Jack & Jane (1999) - Johnny Gottlieb ("When Zoe Met Johnny")
Sliders (1996-1999) - Kit Richards / Officer  O'Hara / Colin Mallory
Wasteland (1999) - Bartender ("Best Laid Plans")
Without a Trace (2004) - Lawyer ("Hawks and Handsaws")
Crossing Jordan (2003-2005) - Calvin ("Skin and Bone" and "Sunset Division")
The Bachelor (2005) - himself (Season 7)
Love, Inc. (2006) - Eric ("Fired Up")
Bar Karma (2011) - Steve ("Fair Catch")
Femme Fatales (2011) - Jay Roma ("Girls Gone Dead", "Visions, Part 1" and "Visions, Part 2")
Reed Between the Lines (2011) - Corey ("Let's Talk About Scared Money")
The Haunted Hathaways (2014) - Wrong Viking ("Haunted Viking")

Film
Cruel Intentions (1999) - Court Reynolds
The Magicians (2000) - Michael DeVane (TV Movie)
Dude, Where's My Car? (2000) - Tommy
Devil's Prey (2001) - David
The New Guy (2002) - Charlie
Kiss the Bride (2002) - Joey
Kraken: Tentacles of the Deep (2006) - Ray (TV Movie)
Sex, Marriage and Infidelity (2015) - Oliver
A Curry on an American Plate (2017) - Bob 
Staged Killer (2019) - Robert

References

External links

1975 births
Male actors from New York City
American male film actors
American male television actors
American people of Irish descent
American people of Italian descent
American people of Polish descent
Living people
New York University alumni
Bachelor Nation contestants